KSS-2 may stand for:
 Korean Attack Submarine program, second phase of a project to build up the ROK Navy's submarine forces.
 Type 214 submarine (Son Won-il class), submarine design chosen under the second phase (KSS-2) of the Korean Attack Submarine program.